For unbuilt projects, see List of German aircraft projects, 1939–45. For missiles, see List of German guided weapons of World War II.

Aero
Aero Ab-101 captured from Czechoslovakia and used as trainer
Aero A.304 captured from Czechoslovakia and used as trainer

Albatros
Albatros Al 101 'L 101', two-seat sportsplane, 1930
Albatros Al 102 'L 102', two-seat sportsplane, 1931
Albatros Al 103 'L 103', two-seat sportsplane, 1932

Arado
Arado Ar 64 fighter
Arado Ar 65 fighter/trainer
Arado Ar 66 trainer/night fighter
Arado Ar 67 fighter (prototype)
Arado Ar 68 fighter
Arado Ar 69 trainer (prototypes), 1933
Arado Ar 76 fighter/trainer
Arado Ar 80 fighter (prototype)
Arado Ar 81 dive bomber (prototype), 1936
Arado Ar 95 patrol/reconnaissance floatplane, 1936
Arado Ar 96 trainer
Arado Ar 196 ship-borne reconnaissance/patrol floatplane
Arado Ar 197 naval fighter (prototype)
Arado Ar 198 reconnaissance (prototype)
Arado Ar 199 seaplane trainer (prototypes)
Arado Ar 231 folding U-boat reconnaissance aircraft (prototype)
Arado Ar 232 transport

Arado Ar 234 Blitz ('Lightning'), jet bomber
Arado Ar 240 heavy fighter
Arado Ar 396 trainer
Arado Ar 440 heavy fighter (prototypes)

Avia
Avia B.71 captured from Czechoslovakia and used as trainer
Avia B.534 captured from Czechoslovakia and used as trainer and night fighter

Bachem
Bachem Ba 349 Natter ('Snake'), rocket interceptor

Bloch
Bloch MB.155 captured from France and used as trainer
Bloch MB.175 captured from France and used as trainer
Bloch MB.200 captured from France and used as trainer

Blohm & Voss
Blohm & Voss BV 40 glider interceptor (prototype)
Blohm & Voss BV 138 flying-boat (formerly Ha 138)
Blohm & Voss Ha 139 long range cargo/mailplane floatplane
Blohm & Voss Ha 140 torpedo bomber seaplane (prototype)
Blohm & Voss BV 141 asymmetric reconnaissance (prototype)
Blohm & Voss BV 142 transport/maritime patrol

Blohm & Voss Bv 144 transport
Blohm & Voss BV 155 high-altitude interceptor (formerly Me 155)
Blohm & Voss BV 222 Wiking ('Viking'), transport flying-boat

Blohm & Voss BV 238 flying-boat (prototype)

Breguet
Breguet 521 Bizerte captured/bought from France and used for air-sea rescue

Bücker
Bücker Bü 131 Jungmann ('Young Man'), biplane trainer
Bücker Bü 133 Jungmeister ('Young Champion'), aerobatic biplane trainer 
Bücker Bü 180 Student ('Student'), trainer
Bücker Bü 181 Bestmann ('Bestman'), trainer/utility transport
Bücker Bü 182 Kornett ('Ensign'), trainer (prototypes)

Cantieri Aeronautici e Navali Triestini (CANT)
CANT Z.1007 captured from Italy after armistice and used as a bomber

Caudron
Caudron C.440 Goéland captured from France and used as transport
Caudron C.630 Simoun captured from France and used as transport

Deutsche Forschungsanstalt für Segelflug (DFS)
DFS SG 38 Schulgleiter training glider
DFS 6 may be 'Model 6' or 'DFS B6'
DFS 39 Lippisch tailless research aircraft
DFS 40 Lippisch tailless research aircraft
DFS 194 rocket-powered research aircraft, forerunner of Me 163
DFS 228 rocket-powered reconnaissance aircraft (prototype)
DFS 230 transport glider
DFS 331 transport glider (prototype)
DFS 332 wing profile research aircraft
DFS 346 supersonic research aircraft (incomplete prototype only)

Dewoitine
Dewoitine D.520 captured from France and used as fighter trainer

Dornier
Dornier Do 10 (Do C1) fighter (prototype), 1931
Dornier Do 11 (Do F) medium bomber, 1931
Dornier Do 12 seaplane, 1932
Dornier Do 13 medium bomber (Development of Do 11), 1933
Dornier Do 14 seaplane (prototype)
Dornier Do 15 Wal ('Whale') reconnaissance flying-boat
Dornier Do 17 mail-plane, bomber and night-fighter
Dornier Do 18 reconnaissance bomber flying-boat, 1935
Dornier Do 19 prototype four engine heavy bomber
Dornier Do 22 torpedo bomber/reconnaissance flying-boat
Dornier Do 23 medium bomber
Dornier Do 24 flying boat

Dornier Do 215 bomber and night-fighter

Dornier Do 217 bomber and night-fighter

Dornier Do 335 fighter-bomber (push-pull engine configuration)

Douglas
Douglas DC-2 captured from Netherlands, includes ex-KLM aircraft, used as transport

Fieseler
Fieseler Fi 2 (F-2 Tiger), acrobatic sportsplane, 1932
Fieseler Fi 5 (F-5) acrobatic sportsplane/trainer, 1933
Fieseler Fi 98 biplane fighter, 1936
Fieseler Fi 103 (V-1), flying bomb
Fieseler Fi 156 Storch ('Stork'), STOL reconnaissance aircraft
Fieseler Fi 167 ship-borne biplane reconnaissance/torpedo bomber

Fieseler Fi 103R "Reichenberg", manned suicide V-1

Flettner
Flettner Fl 184 reconnaissance helicopter, prototype
Flettner Fl 185 reconnaissance helicopter, prototype
Flettner Fl 265 reconnaissance helicopter, prototype
Flettner Fl 282 Kolibri ('Hummingbird'), reconnaissance helicopter

Fiat
 Fiat CR.42 Falco ('Hawk'), ground attack/night fighter 1943-1945

Focke Achgelis
Focke Achgelis Fa 223 Drache ('Kite'), transport helicopter (prototype
Focke Achgelis Fa 266 Hornisse ('Hornet'), helicopter (prototype)
Focke Achgelis Fa 330 helicopter (prototype)
Focke Achgelis Fa 336 scout helicopter (prototype), 1944

Focke-Wulf 
Focke-Wulf Fw 44 Stieglitz ('Goldfinch'), trainer (biplane)
Focke-Wulf Fw 56 Stösser ('Falcon Hawk'), trainer (parasol monoplane)
Focke-Wulf Fw 57 heavy fighter + bomber (prototype)
Focke-Wulf Fw 58 Weihe ('Kite'), trainer/transport
Focke-Wulf Fw 61 helicopter (prototype)
Focke-Wulf Fw 62 ship-borne reconnaissance (biplane seaplane)
Focke-Wulf Ta 152 fighter
Focke-Wulf Ta 153 Ta 152 with high aspect wings
Focke-Wulf Ta 154 Moskito ('Mosquito'), night-fighter
Focke-Wulf Fw 159 fighter (prototype only)

Focke-Wulf Fw 186 reconnaissance autogyro (prototype)
Focke-Wulf Fw 187 Falke ('Falcon'), heavy fighter
Focke-Wulf Fw 189 Uhu ('Owl'), ground-attack
Focke-Wulf Fw 190 Wurger ('Shrike'), fighter
Focke-Wulf Fw 191 twin-engined medium bomber
Focke-Wulf Fw 200 Condor ('Condor'), transport/maritime patrol

Fokker
Fokker C.VE captured from various countries and used as a night ground attack aircraft
Fokker F.IX captured from Czechoslovakia

Göppingen
Göppingen Gö 1 Wolf I sailplane, 1935
Göppingen Gö 3 Minimoa sailplane, 1936
Göppingen Gö 4 sailplane
Göppingen Gö 5 sailplane, 1937
Göppingen Gö 8 1:5 scale development aircraft for Dornier Do 214 project
Göppingen Gö 9 development aircraft for Do 335 Pfiel pusher engine

Gotha
Gotha Go 145 trainer
Gotha Go 146 transport, 1935
Gotha Go 147 STOL reconnaissance (prototype)
Gotha Go 229 flying-wing jet fighter-bomber
Gotha Go 242 transport glider
Gotha Go 244 transport
Gotha Go 345 assault glider
Gotha Ka 430 transport glider (prototypes)

Heinkel
Heinkel He 37 fighter
Heinkel He 38 fighter
Heinkel He 43 fighter
Heinkel He 45 bomber/trainer
Heinkel He 46 reconnaissance
Heinkel He 49 fighter
Heinkel He 50 reconnaissance/dive bomber
Heinkel He 51 fighter/close-support
Heinkel He 59 reconnaissance/air-sea rescue floatplane
Heinkel He 60 ship-borne reconnaissance floatplane
Heinkel He 70 Blitz ('Lightning'), transport/bomber, 1932
Heinkel He 72 Kadett ('Cadet'), trainer
Heinkel He 74 fighter/advanced trainer (prototype)
Heinkel He 100 fighter
Heinkel He 111 bomber
Heinkel He 112 fighter
Heinkel He 113 (propaganda designation for He 100)
Heinkel He 114 reconnaissance seaplane
Heinkel He 115 general-purpose seaplane
Heinkel He 116 transport + reconnaissance
Heinkel He 118 dive bomber
Heinkel He 119 high-speed reconnaissance/bomber (prototypes), 1937

Heinkel He 162 Volksjäger ('People's Fighter'), jet fighter
Heinkel He 172 trainer (prototype)
Heinkel He 176 experimental rocket aircraft
Heinkel He 177 Greif ('Griffon'), heavy bomber
Heinkel He 178 experimental jet aircraft
Heinkel He 219 Uhu ('Owl'), night fighter
Heinkel He 274 high-altitude bomber
Heinkel He 277 four-engine He 177
Heinkel He 280 jet fighter

Henschel

Henschel Hs 121 fighter/trainer (prototype)
Henschel Hs 123 ground-attack (biplane)
Henschel Hs 124 heavy fighter/bomber (prototype)
Henschel Hs 125 fighter/trainer (prototype)
Henschel Hs 126 reconnaissance
Henschel Hs 127 jet bomber (prototype)
Henschel Hs 129 ground-attack
Henschel Hs 130 high altitude reconnaissance/bomber (prototype)
Henschel Hs 132 jet dive bomber (prototype)

Junkers
Junkers W 33 utility transport, 1926
Junkers W 34 utility transport/trainer, 1933
Junkers Ju 52 Tante Ju ('Auntie Ju'), transport/bomber
Junkers Ju 86 bomber/reconnaissance/transport
Junkers Ju 87 Stuka, dive-bomber
Junkers Ju 88 reconnaissance/bomber/night-fighter
Junkers Ju 89 heavy bomber (prototype)
Junkers Ju 90 bomber (prototype)

Junkers Ju 188 Rächer ('Avenger'), bomber
Junkers Ju 248 Junkers version of Me 263
Junkers Ju 252 transport
Junkers Ju 287 heavy jet bomber (prototype)
Junkers Ju 288 bomber (prototype)
Junkers Ju 290 long-range bomber (prototype)
Junkers Ju 322 Mammut (Mammoth), transport glider (prototype), 1941)
Junkers Ju 352 Herkules ('Hercules'), transport
Junkers Ju 388 Störtebeker, reconnaissance/night-fighter
Junkers Ju 390 long-range bomber
Junkers Ju 488 heavy bomber
Junkers EF 61 high-altitude bomber (prototype)
Junkers EF 131 jet bomber (prototype)
Junkers EF 132 heavy bomber (prototype)

Klemm
Klemm Kl 31 single-engine transport, 1931
Klemm Kl 32 single-engine transport, 1931
Klemm Kl 33 (Klemm L33), single-seat ultra-light sportplane (prototype), 1933
Klemm Kl 35 sportplane/trainer, 1935
Klemm Kl 36 single-engine transport, 1934

Latécoère
Latécoère 298 captured from France

Lioré et Olivier (LeO)
Lioré et Olivier LeO H-246 captured from France and used as transports

Macchi
Macchi C.202 captured from Italy after armistice and used as trainers
Macchi C.205 captured from Italy after armistice and used as fighters

Marinens Flyvebaatfabrikk
Høver/Marinens Flyvebaatfabrikk M.F.11 captured from Finland and used as transport

Messerschmitt
Messerschmitt Bf 108 Taifun ('Typhoon'), utility transport/trainer
Messerschmitt Bf 109 fighter
Messerschmitt Bf 110 heavy fighter/night-fighter
Messerschmitt Bf 162 bomber (prototype)
Messerschmitt Bf 163 STOL reconnaissance aircraft (prototypes only)
Messerschmitt Me 163 Komet ('Comet'), rocket interceptor 
Messerschmitt Me 209 speed-record aircraft (prototype)
Messerschmitt Me 209-II fighter (prototype – unrelated to Me 209)
Messerschmitt Me 210 heavy fighter/reconnaissance
Messerschmitt Me 261 long-range reconnaissance
Messerschmitt Me 262 Schwalbe ('Swallow'), jet fighter-bomber
Messerschmitt Me 263 rocket interceptor 
Messerschmitt Me 264 Amerika Bomber long-range bomber (prototype)
Messerschmitt Me 309 fighter (prototype)
Messerschmitt Me 321 Gigant ('Giant'), transport glider
Messerschmitt Me 323 Gigant ('Giant'), transport aircraft
Messerschmitt Me 328 parasite fighter

Messerschmitt Me 410 Hornisse ('Hornet'), heavy fighter + reconnaissance

Messerschmitt P.1101 jet fighter (prototype)

Morane-Saulnier
Morane-Saulnier M.S.230 captured from France and used as trainer
Morane-Saulnier M.S.406 captured from France and used as fighter trainer

North American Aviation
North American NA-57 captured from France and used as trainer
North American NA-64 captured from France and used as trainer
North American P-51 captured

Podlaska Wytwórnia Samolotów (PWS)
PWS-26 captured from Czechoslovakia and use as trainer

Savoia-Marchetti
Savoia-Marchetti SM.79 captured from Italy after armistice
Savoia-Marchetti SM.82 captured from Italy after armistice and used as transports

Siebel
Siebel Fh 104 Hallore, medium transport
Siebel Si 201 STOL reconnaissance aircraft (prototype)
Siebel Si 202 Hummel ('bumblebee') sportplane/trainer, 1938
Siebel Si 204 transport/crew trainer

Zlín
Zlín Z-XII captured from Czechoslovakia and used as a trainer
Zlín Z-212 captured from Czechoslovakia and used as a trainer

See also
List of aircraft engines of Germany during World War II
List of aircraft of the French Air Force during World War II
List of common World War II infantry weapons
List of gliders
List of RLM aircraft designations (for a full listing by type designations)
List of weapons of military aircraft of Germany during World War II
List of World War II military aircraft of Germany

External links
Virtual Aviation Museum
German Military Aircraft Designations (1933–1945)

German Luftwaffe aircraft by manufacturer, World War II
Aircraft